Mola Sylla (born Dakar, Senegal, 1956) is a Senegalese musician. He moved to Europe in 1987 and lives in Amsterdam, Netherlands.  He is a singer and plays such traditional African instruments as the mbira, kongoma (Senegalese lamellophone), xalam, and kalimba.

Sylla has collaborated with a wide variety of musicians, including in jazz and cross-cultural settings. He has worked with Ernst Reijseger, with whom he composed the score to Werner Herzog's 2005 film The Wild Blue Yonder.

He is a founding member of the groups Senemali (a collaboration between Senegalese and Malian musicians) and VeDaKi (formerly Vershki da Koreshki, a quartet made up of Senegalese, Russian, and Indian musicians).

Discography

With Vershki Da Koreshki
Vershki da Koreshki (Al Sur, 1996)
Real Life of Plants (Shanachie, 1997)

With Vedaki
Gombi Zor (Vedaki Records, 1999)
Samm (Vedaki Records, 2008)

With Volkovtrio
Much Better (Green Wave Records, 1998)

With Vladimir Volkov
Seetu/Mirror/Зеркало (Long Arms Records, 2002)

With Ernst Reijseger
Janna (Winter & Winter, 2003)
Requiem for a Dying Planet (Winter & Winter, 2006)

With Ernst Reijseger and Harmen Fraanje

Down Deep (Winter & Winter, 2013) 
Count til Zen (Winter & Winter, 2015)
We Were There (Just Listen, 2020)

External links
Mola Sylla official site
Mola Sylla CV
Mola Sylla biography and discography

1956 births
Living people
21st-century Senegalese male singers
People from Dakar
Musicians from Amsterdam
20th-century Senegalese male singers
Senegalese emigrants to the Netherlands